L'Esperance Rock, formerly known as French Rock and Brind Rock,(named after William Brind) is the southernmost islet in the Kermadec Islands, to the north of New Zealand.

Important Bird Area
The island forms part of the Kermadec Islands Important Bird Area, identified as such by BirdLife International because it is an important site for nesting seabirds.  It is the site of a substantial breeding colony of grey noddies.  Masked boobies have also been recorded breeding there.

Flora
As well as other plants, there is an endemic conifer on the rock, Senecio esperensis.

See also

 2012 Kermadec Islands eruption and pumice raft
 New Zealand outlying islands
 List of islands of New Zealand
 List of islands
 Desert island

References

 

Islands of the Kermadec Islands
Uninhabited islands of New Zealand
Important Bird Areas of the Kermadec Islands